The Charles Grilk House is a historic building located in the central part of Davenport, Iowa, United States. It has been listed on the National Register of Historic Places since 1984.

History
The house was designed by the Davenport architectural firm of Temple, Burrows & McLane, and is an example of one of their more modest designs. It is a reminder that architects also designed houses for people with smaller budgets as well as those who are wealthy and build larger homes. The dwelling was featured in the February 1907 edition of Architectural Review as a "Plaster House." The house was built in 1906 for Charles Grilk and has a history of brief and complicated residency and occupancy patterns.

Architecture
The house is a modified Dutch Colonial Revival Bungalow with an American Craftsman aesthetic in its use of materials and the self-contained efficiency of its plan. The 1½-story, frame house, follows a rectangular plan. It features a narrow, molded cornice; side-gambrel roof; and two dormers on the front. The main entrance into the house is flanked by sidelights and covered by a flared eave. There is a polygonal-bay next to the main entry.

References

Houses completed in 1906
Bungalow architecture in Iowa
Colonial Revival architecture in Iowa
Houses in Davenport, Iowa
Houses on the National Register of Historic Places in Iowa
National Register of Historic Places in Davenport, Iowa
1906 establishments in Iowa